Minuscule 168 (in the Gregory-Aland numbering), Θε31 (Soden), is a Greek minuscule manuscript of the New Testament, on parchment. Palaeographically it has been assigned  to the 13th century. It has marginalia.

Description 

The codex contains the text of the four Gospels on 217 thick parchment leaves (size ), with Theophylact's commentary, and some lacunae (Luke 24:13-53; John 1:1-14). 
The beginning of the codex was destroyed by humidity.

The text is written in two columns per page, in 40 lines per page, in brown-black ink.

There is also a division according to the Ammonian Sections, with references to the Eusebian Canons (written below Ammonian Section numbers).

Text 

The Greek text of the codex is a mixture of text-types. Aland did not place it in any Category.
According to the Claremont Profile Method it has mixed text in Luke 1, in Luke 10 it has mixture of the Byzantine text-families. In Luke 20 the manuscript is defective. It has some relationship to the cluster 1675 in Luke 1 and to group Λ.

History 

The manuscript was examined by Birch (about 1782) and Scholz (1794–1852). C. R. Gregory saw the manuscript in 1886.

It is currently housed at the Vatican Library (Barb. gr. 570), at Rome.

See also 

 List of New Testament minuscules
 Biblical manuscript
 Textual criticism

References

Further reading 

 

Greek New Testament minuscules
13th-century biblical manuscripts
Manuscripts of the Vatican Library